Gothic is the second full-length album released by British heavy metal band Paradise Lost.

The album has been re-released and remastered twice. The 2003 re-release contains two remixes of songs from Lost Paradise (1990), bringing the total running time to 49 minutes and 30 seconds. Remixed/live versions of the songs "Eternal", "Gothic" and "The Painless" appear on the 2003 digipak re-release of Lost Paradise. In 2008, Gothic was re-released with a bonus DVD with a rare performance by the band. The album was performed in full at the 2016 Roadburn festival and released by the band on Bandcamp.

Reception

AllMusic gave Gothic a three-star mixed review. In June 2005, Gothic was inducted into the Decibel Magazine Hall of Fame, becoming the fifth album overall to be featured there.

Track listing
All songs written by Nick Holmes and Gregor Mackintosh.

Personnel
 Nick Holmes – vocals
 Matthew Archer – drums
 Stephen Edmondson – bass
 Aaron Aedy – guitars
 Gregor Mackintosh – guitars

Guest musicians
 The Raptured Symphony Orchestra – orchestral sections
 Sarah Marrion – vocals

Production
 Keith Appleton – engineering
 Richard Moran – cover art, photography

References

Paradise Lost (band) albums
1991 albums